The European Cup was an annual bandy club competition between teams from Europe. The first edition of the tournament was held in 1974. The most recent competition was in 2009, but it has not been formally discontinued.

Clubs qualified for the cup by becoming champions in their own national championship. This meant that only four teams took part – the national championship teams from Finland, Norway, Soviet Union/Russia, and Sweden. The tournament was dominated by teams from Russia (the Soviet Union until 1991), and Sweden. Teams from those countries won every tournament.

Editions

External links
Swedish bandy association - European Cup

International bandy competitions
Bandy competitions in Europe
Recurring sporting events established in 1974
1974 establishments in Europe